Tom Okker and Marty Riessen were the defending champions, but lost in the semifinals this year.

Jimmy Connors and Ilie Năstase won the title, defeating Bob Carmichael and Frew McMillan 6–3, 6–7, 6–2 in the final.

Seeds

Draw

Finals

Top half

Bottom half

External links
 Draw

Stockholm Open
1973 Grand Prix (tennis)